The 2018 Philadelphia Phillies season was the 136th season in the history of the franchise, its 15th season at Citizens Bank Park, and the 1st season with manager Gabe Kapler. They improved from their 66–96 season in 2017 by posting an 80–82 record, but missed the postseason for the seventh consecutive season. Kapler had the second-most wins among Phillies managers historically after 100 games (56), and under Kapler, the 2018 team improved its end-of-season won-lost record by 14 games.

Season standings

National League East

National League Wild Card

Record vs. opponents

Game log

|- style="background:#fbb"
| 1 || March 29 || @ Braves || 5–8 || Arodys Vizcaíno (1–0) || Héctor Neris (0–1) || — || 40,208 || 0–1
|- style="background:#bfb"
| 2 || March 30 || @ Braves || 5–4 (11) || Drew Hutchison (1–0) || Shane Carle (0–1) || — || 35,123 || 1–1
|- style="background:#fbb"
| 3 || March 31 || @ Braves || 2–15 || Brandon McCarthy (1–0) || Vince Velasquez (0–1) || — || 37,777 || 1–2
|-

|- style="background:#bbb"
| — || April 2 || @ Mets || colspan=6 | Postponed (cold and wet conditions; snow) Makeup: July 9 as a single-admission doubleheader
|- style="background:#fbb"
| 4 || April 3 || @ Mets || 0–2 || Jerry Blevins (1–0) || Ben Lively (0–1) || Jeurys Familia (2) || 21,397 || 1–3
|- style="background:#fbb"
| 5 || April 4 || @ Mets || 2–4 || Robert Gsellman (1–0) || Drew Hutchison (1–1) || Jeurys Familia (3) || 21,328 || 1–4
|- style="background:#bfb"
| 6 || April 5 || Marlins || 5–0 || Nick Pivetta (1–0) || Caleb Smith (0–1) || — || 44,488 || 2–4
|- style="background:#bfb"
| 7 || April 7 || Marlins || 20–1 || Vince Velasquez (1–1) || Dillon Peters (1–1) || Jake Thompson (1) || 33,660 || 3–4
|- style="background:#fbb"
| 8 || April 8 || Marlins || 3–6 || Odrisamer Despaigne (2–0) || Luis García (0–1) || Brad Ziegler (1) || 34,326 || 3–5
|- style="background:#bfb"
| 9 || April 9 || Reds || 6–5 || Luis García (1–1) || Kevin Quackenbush (0–1) || Héctor Neris (1) || 18,127 || 4–5
|- style="background:#bfb"
| 10 || April 10 || Reds || 6–1 || Aaron Nola (1–0) || Jared Hughes (0–1) || — || 20,895 || 5–5
|- style="background:#bfb"
| 11 || April 11 || Reds || 4–3 (12) || Yacksel Ríos (1–0)  || Austin Brice (0–1) || — || 19,099  || 6–5
|- style="background:#bfb"
| 12 || April 13 || @ Rays || 2–1 || Edubray Ramos (1–0) || Álex Colomé (0–2) || Héctor Neris (2) || 13,372 || 7–5
|- style="background:#bfb"
| 13 || April 14 || @ Rays || 9–4 || Jake Arrieta (1–0) || Chris Archer (1–1) || — || 20,934 || 8–5
|- style="background:#bfb"
| 14 || April 15 || @ Rays || 10–4 || Yacksel Ríos (2–0) || Ryan Yarbrough (0–1) || — || 19,841 || 9–5
|- style="background:#fbb"
| 15 || April 16 || @ Braves || 1–2 || Julio Teherán (1–1) || Aaron Nola (1–1) || Arodys Vizcaíno (1) || 17,812 || 9–6
|- style="background:#bfb"
| 16 || April 17 || @ Braves || 5–1 (10) || Héctor Neris (1–1) || José Ramírez (0–2) || — || 17,913 || 10–6
|- style="background:#fbb"
| 17 || April 18 || @ Braves || 3–7 || Brandon McCarthy (3–0) || Vince Velasquez (1–2) || — || 22,135 || 10–7
|- style="background:#bfb"
| 18 || April 19 || Pirates || 7–0 || Jake Arrieta (2–0) || Jameson Taillon (2–1) || — || 19,071 || 11–7
|- style="background:#bfb"
| 19 || April 20 || Pirates || 2–1 || Luis García (2–1) || George Kontos (1–2) || Héctor Neris (3) || 20,183 || 12–7
|- style="background:#bfb"
| 20 || April 21 || Pirates || 6–2 || Aaron Nola (2–1) || Michael Feliz (0–1) || Héctor Neris (4) || 28,161 || 13–7
|- style="background:#bfb"
| 21 || April 22 || Pirates || 3–2 (11) || Yacksel Ríos (3–0) || Richard Rodríguez (0–1) || — || 29,199 || 14–7
|- style="background:#fbb"
| 22 || April 24 || Diamondbacks || 4–8 || Fernando Salas (3–1) || Vince Velasquez (1–3) || — || 18,195 || 14–8
|- style="background:#bfb"
| 23 || April 25 || Diamondbacks || 5–3 || Jake Arrieta (3–0) || Zack Greinke (2–2) || Héctor Neris (5) || 21,349 || 15–8
|- style="background:#fbb"
| 24 || April 26 || Diamondbacks || 2–8 || Matt Koch (1–0) || Ben Lively (0–2) || — || 20,335 || 15–9
|- style="background:#bfb"
| 25 || April 27 || Braves || 7–3 || Aaron Nola (3–1) || Max Fried (0–2) || — || 27,076 || 16–9
|- style="background:#fbb"
| 26 || April 28 || Braves || 1–4 || Mike Foltynewicz (2–1) || Nick Pivetta (1–1) || Arodys Vizcaíno (3) || 27,794 || 16–10
|- style="background:#fbb"
| 27 || April 29 || Braves || 1–10 || Brandon McCarthy (4–0) || Vince Velasquez (1–4) || — || 30,010 || 16–11
|- style="background:#fbb"
| 28 || April 30 || @ Marlins || 4–8 || Merandy González (2–0) || Jake Arrieta (3–1) || — || 5,415 || 16–12
|-

|- style="background:#fbb"
| 29 || May 1 || @ Marlins || 1–2 (10) || Junichi Tazawa (1–1) || Yacksel Ríos (3–1) || — || 5,844|| 16–13
|- style="background:#bfb"
| 30 || May 2 || @ Marlins || 6–0 || Aaron Nola (4–1) || José Ureña (0–5) || — || 5,941 || 17–13
|- style="background:#fbb"
| 31 || May 4 || @ Nationals || 3–7 || Gio González (4–2) || Nick Pivetta (1–2) || – || 35,497 || 17–14
|- style="background:#bfb"
| 32 || May 5 || @ Nationals || 3–1 || Vince Velasquez (2–4) || Tanner Roark (2–3) || Héctor Neris (6) || 34,687 || 18–14
|- style="background:#fbb"
| 33 || May 6 || @ Nationals || 4–5 || Sean Doolittle  (1–1) || Héctor Neris (1–2) || — || 30,611 || 18–15
|- style="background:#bfb"
| 34 || May 7 || Giants || 11–0 || Zach Eflin (1–0) || Jeff Samardzija (1–2) || — || 17,050 || 19–15
|- style="background:#bfb"
| 35 || May 8 || Giants || 4–2 || Aaron Nola (5–1) || Derek Holland (1–4) || Héctor Neris (7) || 22,456 || 20–15
|- style="background:#bfb"
| 36 || May 9 || Giants || 11–3 || Nick Pivetta (2–2) || Chris Stratton (3–3) || — || 18,448 || 21–15
|- style="background:#bfb"
| 37 || May 10 || Giants || 6–3 || Vince Velasquez (3–4) || Ty Blach (3–4) || Héctor Neris (8) || 30,204 || 22–15
|- style="background:#fbb"
| 38 || May 11 || Mets || 1–3 || A. J. Ramos (2–2) || Héctor Neris (1–3) || Jeurys Familia (11) || 29,247 || 22–16
|- style="background:#bbb"
| — || May 12 || Mets || colspan=6 | Postponed (rain) Makeup: August 16 as a single-admission doubleheader
|- style="background:#bfb"
| 39 || May 13 || Mets || 4–2 || Aaron Nola (6–1) || Paul Sewald (0–3) || Edubray Ramos (1) || 34,091 || 23–16
|- style="background:#bbb"
| — || May 15 || @ Orioles || colspan=6 | Postponed (rain) Makeup: July 12 as a single game
|- style="background:#bfb"
| 40 || May 16 || @ Orioles || 4–1 || Nick Pivetta (3–2) || Andrew Cashner (1–5) || — || 29,706 || 24–16
|- style="background:#bfb"
| 41 || May 17 || @ Cardinals || 6–2 || Vince Velasquez (4–4) || Luke Weaver (3–3) || — || 41,309 || 25–16
|- style="background:#fbb"
| 42 || May 18 || @ Cardinals || 4–12 || Michael Wacha (5–1) || Jake Arrieta (3–2) || — || 42,050 || 25–17
|- style="background:#bfb"
| 43 || May 19 || @ Cardinals || 7–6 || Tommy Hunter (1–0) || Greg Holland (0–2) || Seranthony Domínguez (1) || 44,431 || 26–17
|- style="background:#fbb"
| 44 || May 20 || @ Cardinals || 1–5 || Jack Flaherty (1–1) || Aaron Nola (6–2) || — || 43,560 || 26–18
|- style="background:#bfb"
| 45 || May 21 || Braves || 3–0 || Nick Pivetta (4–2) || Mike Foltynewicz (3–3) || Héctor Neris (9) || 21,284 || 27–18
|- style="background:#fbb"
| 46 || May 22 || Braves || 1–3 || Brandon McCarthy (5–2) || Vince Velasquez (4–5) || Arodys Vizcaíno (9) || 18,545 || 27–19
|- style="background:#bfb"
| 47 || May 23 || Braves || 4–0 || Jake Arrieta (4–2) || Luiz Gohara (0–1) || — || 27,647 || 28–19
|- style="background:#fbb"
| 48 || May 25 || Blue Jays || 5–6 || Sam Gaviglio (2–0) || Zach Eflin (1–1) || Ryan Tepera (1) || 21,374 || 28–20
|- style="background:#bfb"
| 49 || May 26 || Blue Jays || 2–1 || Seranthony Domínguez (1–0) || Joe Biagini (0–4) || Luis García (1) || 26,788 || 29–20
|- style="background:#fbb"
| 50 || May 27 || Blue Jays || 3–5 || J. A. Happ (7–3) || Nick Pivetta (4–3) || Ryan Tepera (2) || 24,182 || 29–21
|- style="background:#fbb"
| 51 || May 28 || @ Dodgers || 4–5 || Yimi García (1–0) || Adam Morgan (0–1) || Kenley Jansen (12) || 39,759 || 29–22
|- style="background:#bfb"
| 52 || May 29 || @ Dodgers || 6–1 || Jake Arrieta (5–2) || Kenta Maeda (4–4) || — || 40,044 || 30–22
|- style="background:#fbb"
| 53 || May 30 || @ Dodgers || 2–8 || Ross Stripling (3–1) || Zach Eflin (1–2) || — || 43,302 || 30–23
|- style="background:#bfb"
| 54 || May 31 || @ Dodgers || 2–1 || Aaron Nola (7–2) || Josh Fields (2–2) || Seranthony Domínguez (2) || 40,986 || 31–23
|-

|- style="background:#fbb"
| 55 || June 1 || @ Giants || 0–4 || Chris Stratton (7–3) || Nick Pivetta (4–4) || — || 38,119 || 31–24
|- style="background:#fbb"
| 56 || June 2 || @ Giants || 0–2 || Andrew Suarez (2–4) || Vince Velasquez (4–6) || Hunter Strickland (12) || 39,208 || 31–25
|- style="background:#fbb"
| 57 || June 3 || @ Giants || 1–6 || Dereck Rodríguez (1–0) || Jake Arrieta (5–3) || — || 40,491 || 31–26
|- style="background:#bfb"
| 58 || June 5 || @ Cubs || 6–1 || Zach Eflin (2–2) || Kyle Hendricks (4–5) || — || 40,553 || 32–26
|- style="background:#fbb"
| 59 || June 6 || @ Cubs || 5–7 || Cory Mazzoni (1–0) || Adam Morgan (0–2) || — || 40,275 || 32–27
|- style="background:#fbb"
| 60 || June 7 || @ Cubs || 3–4 || Brian Duensing (2–0) || Nick Pivetta (4–5) || Brandon Morrow (15) || 40,057 || 32–28
|- style="background:#fbb"
| 61 || June 8 || Brewers || 4–12 || Jhoulys Chacín (5–1) || Vince Velasquez (4–7) || — || 22,196 || 32–29
|- style="background:#fbb"
| 62 || June 9 || Brewers || 3–12 || Brent Suter (6–4) || Jake Arrieta (5–4) || — || 25,304 || 32–30
|- style="background:#bfb"
| 63 || June 10 || Brewers || 4–3 || Zach Eflin (3–2) || Dan Jennings (3–2) || Tommy Hunter (1) || 31,175 || 33–30
|- style="background:#bfb"
| 64 || June 12 || Rockies || 5–4 || Aaron Nola (8–2) || Jon Gray (6–7) || Seranthony Domínguez (3) || 19,556 || 34–30
|- style="background:#fbb"
| 65 || June 13 || Rockies || 2–7 || Tyler Anderson (4–1) || Nick Pivetta (4–6) || — || 20,075 || 34–31
|- style="background:#bfb"
| 66 || June 14 || Rockies || 9–3 || Vince Velasquez (5–7) || Germán Márquez (4–7) || — || 22,500 || 35–31
|- style="background:#fbb"
| 67 || June 15 || @ Brewers || 2–13 || Brent Suter (7–4) || Jake Arrieta (5–5) || — || 40,945 || 35–32
|- style="background:#bfb"
| 68 || June 16 || @ Brewers || 4–1 || Zach Eflin (4–2) || Junior Guerra (3–5) || Héctor Neris (10) || 40,531 || 36–32
|- style="background:#bfb"
| 69 || June 17 || @ Brewers || 10–9 || Tommy Hunter (2–0) || Chase Anderson (5–6) || Jake Thompson (2) || 40,985 || 37–32
|- style="background:#bfb"
| 70 || June 18 || Cardinals || 6–5 (10) || Jake Thompson (1–0) || Matt Bowman (0–2) || — || 22,083 || 38–32
|- style="background:#fbb"
| 71 || June 19 || Cardinals || 6–7 || Jordan Hicks (3–1) || Seranthony Domínguez (1–1) || — || 21,122 || 38–33
|- style="background:#bfb"
| 72 || June 20 || Cardinals || 4–3 || Edubray Ramos (2–0) || Sam Tuivailala (1–3) || Adam Morgan (1) || 26,120 || 39–33
|- style="background:#bfb"
| 73 || June 22 || @ Nationals || 12–2 || Zach Eflin (5–2) || Tanner Roark (3–8) || — || 35,630 || 40–33
|- style="background:#bfb"
| 74 || June 23 || @ Nationals || 5–3 || Aaron Nola (9–2) || Erick Fedde (0–3) || Seranthony Domínguez (4) || 40,341 || 41–33
|- style="background:#fbb"
| 75 || June 24 || @ Nationals || 6–8 || Ryan Madson (2–3) || Seranthony Domínguez (1–2) || Sean Doolittle (21) || 29,314 || 41–34
|- style="background:#fbb"
| 76 || June 25 || Yankees || 2–4 || Jonathan Loáisiga (2–0) || Vince Velasquez (5–8) || Aroldis Chapman (28) || 44,136 || 41–35
|- style="background:#fbb"
| 77 || June 26 || Yankees || 0–6 || Luis Severino (12–2) || Jake Arrieta (5–6) || — || 43,569 || 41–36
|- style="background:#bfb"
| 78 || June 27 || Yankees || 3–0 || Zach Eflin (6–2) || Luis Cessa (0–1) || Seranthony Domínguez (5) || 42,028 || 42–36
|- style="background:#bfb"
| 79 || June 28 || Nationals || 4–3 || Aaron Nola (10–2) || Tanner Roark (3–9) || Seranthony Domínguez (6) || 25,026 || 43–36
|- style="background:#fbb"
| 80 || June 29 || Nationals || 7–17 || Erick Fedde (1–3) || Nick Pivetta (4–7) || — || 36,903 || 43–37
|- style="background:#bfb"
| 81 || June 30 || Nationals || 3–2 || Víctor Arano (1–0) || Jeremy Hellickson (2–1) || Seranthony Domínguez (7) || 42,746 || 44–37
|-

|- style="background:#bfb"
| 82 || July 1 || Nationals || 4–3 (13) || Nick Pivetta (5–7) || Justin Miller (5–1) || — || 22,051 || 45–37
|- style="background:#bfb"
| 83 || July 3 || Orioles || 3–2 || Zach Eflin (7–2) || Alex Cobb (2–10) || Seranthony Domínguez (8) || 28,204 || 46–37
|- style="background:#bfb"
| 84 || July 4 || Orioles || 4–1 || Aaron Nola (11–2) || Yefry Ramírez (0–2) || Víctor Arano (1) || 30,943 || 47–37
|- style="background:#bfb"
| 85 || July 6 || @ Pirates || 17–5 || Edubray Ramos (3–0) || Trevor Williams (6–7) || — || 24,846 || 48–37
|- style="background:#bfb"
| 86 || July 7 || @ Pirates || 3–2 || Jake Arrieta (6–6) || Jameson Taillon (5–7) || Víctor Arano (2) || 28,150 || 49–37
|- style="background:#fbb"
| 87 || July 8 || @ Pirates || 1–4 || Nick Kingham (3–4) || Drew Anderson (0–1) || Felipe Vázquez (18) || 19,542 || 49–38
|- style="background:#fbb"
| 88 || July 9 (1) || @ Mets || 3–4 (10) || Tim Peterson (2–1) || Víctor Arano (1–1) || — || see 2nd game || 49–39
|- style="background:#bfb"
| 89 || July 9 (2) || @ Mets || 3–1 || Aaron Nola (12–2) || Corey Oswalt (0–2) || Víctor Arano (3) || 24,139 || 50–39
|- style="background:#bfb"
| 90 || July 10 || @ Mets || 7–3 || Enyel De Los Santos (1–0) || Drew Gagnon (0–1) || — || 22,416 || 51–39
|- style="background:#fbb"
| 91 || July 11 || @ Mets || 0–3 (10) || Robert Gsellman (6–2) || Mark Leiter Jr. (0–1) || — || 22,137  || 51–40
|- style="background:#bfb"
| 92 || July 12 || @ Orioles || 5–4 || Nick Pivetta (6–7) || Kevin Gausman (4–7) || Seranthony Domínguez (9) || 20,100 || 52–40
|- style="background:#bfb"
| 93 || July 13 || @ Marlins || 2–0 || Jake Arrieta (7–6) || Wei-Yin Chen (2–7) || Pat Neshek (1) || 8,090 || 53–40
|- style="background:#fbb"
| 94 || July 14 || @ Marlins || 0–2 || Trevor Richards (3–5) || Aaron Nola (12–3) || Kyle Barraclough (9) || 14,793 || 53–41
|- style="background:#fbb"
| 95 || July 15 || @ Marlins || 5–10 || Elieser Hernández (2–5) || Edubray Ramos (3–1) || — || 8,829 || 53–42
|- style="background:#bbcaff;"
| – || July 17 ||colspan="7" |2018 Major League Baseball All-Star Game at Nationals Park in Washington, D.C.
|- style="background:#bfb"
| 96 || July 20 || Padres || 11–5 || Austin Davis (1–0) || Clayton Richard (7–9) || — || 30,034 || 54–42
|- style="background:#bbb"
| — || July 21 || Padres || colspan=6 | Postponed (rain) Makeup: July 22 as a split-admission doubleheader
|- style="background:#fbb"
| 97 || July 22 (1) || Padres || 2–10 || Tyson Ross (6–8) || Nick Pivetta (6–8) || — || 29,392 || 54–43
|- style="background:#bfb"
| 98 || July 22 (2) || Padres || 5–0 || Vince Velasquez (6–8) || Luis Perdomo (1–5) || — || 25,054 || 55–43
|- style="background:#fbb"
| 99 || July 23 || Dodgers || 6–7 || Scott Alexander (2–0) || Seranthony Domínguez (1–3) || Kenley Jansen (29) || 33,753 || 55–44
|- style="background:#bfb"
| 100 || July 24 || Dodgers || 7–4 (16) || Vince Velasquez (7–8) || Enrique Hernández (0–1) || — || 35,028 || 56–44
|- style="background:#bfb"
| 101 || July 25 || Dodgers || 7–3 || Jake Arrieta (8–6) || Walker Buehler (4–3) || Seranthony Domínguez (10) || 35,659 || 57–44
|- style="background:#bfb"
| 102 || July 26 || @ Reds || 9–4 || Ranger Suárez (1–0) || Michael Lorenzen (1–1) || — || 17,031 || 58–44
|- style="background:#fbb"
| 103 || July 27 || @ Reds || 4–6 || David Hernandez (4–0) || Nick Pivetta (6–9) || Raisel Iglesias (20) || 24,776 || 58–45
|- style="background:#fbb"
| 104 || July 28 || @ Reds || 2–6 || Wandy Peralta (2–2) || Tommy Hunter (2–1) || Jared Hughes (7) || 35,249 || 58–46
|- style="background:#fbb"
| 105 || July 29 || @ Reds || 0–4 || Luis Castillo (6–8) || Zach Eflin (7–3) || Raisel Iglesias (21) || 21,649 || 58–47
|- style="background:#fbb"
| 106 || July 30 || @ Red Sox || 1–2 (13) || Héctor Velázquez (7–0) || Austin Davis (1–1) || — || 37,722 || 58–48
|- style="background:#bfb"
| 107 || July 31 || @ Red Sox || 3–1 || Jake Arrieta (9–6) || Drew Pomeranz (1–5) || Seranthony Domínguez (11) || 37,816 || 59–48
|-

|- style="background:#bfb"
| 108 || August 2 || Marlins || 5–2 || Tommy Hunter (3–1) || Kyle Barraclough (0–5) || — || 26,050 || 60–48
|- style="background:#bfb"
| 109 || August 3 || Marlins || 5–1 || Vince Velasquez (8–8) || Trevor Richards (3–6) || Seranthony Domínguez (12) || 33,737 || 61–48
|- style="background:#bfb"
| 110 || August 4 || Marlins || 8–3 || Zach Eflin (8–3) || José Ureña (3–11) || — || 35,194 || 62–48
|- style="background:#bfb"
| 111 || August 5 || Marlins || 5–3 || Pat Neshek (1–0) || Drew Steckenrider (3–2) || Tommy Hunter (2) || 42,343 || 63–48
|- style="background:#fbb"
| 112 || August 6 || @ Diamondbacks || 2–3 (14) || Yoshihisa Hirano (3–2) || Austin Davis (1–2) || — || 21,131 || 63–49
|- style="background:#bfb"
| 113 || August 7 || @ Diamondbacks || 5–2 || Nick Pivetta (7–9) || Zack Greinke (12–7) || Pat Neshek (2) || 22,382 || 64–49
|- style="background:#fbb"
| 114 || August 8 || @ Diamondbacks || 0–6 || Patrick Corbin (9–4) || Vince Velasquez (8–9) || — || 23,384 || 64–50
|- style="background:#fbb"
| 115 || August 10 || @ Padres || 0–2 || Jacob Nix (1–0) || Zach Eflin (8–4) || Kirby Yates (4) || 26,306 || 64–51
|- style="background:#bfb"
| 116 || August 11 || @ Padres || 5–1 || Aaron Nola (13–3) || Walker Lockett (0–3) || — || 35,098 || 65–51
|- style="background:#fbb"
| 117 || August 12 || @ Padres || 3–9 || Joey Lucchesi (6–6) || Jake Arrieta (9–7) || — || 26,930 || 65–52
|- style="background:#fbb"
| 118 || August 14 || Red Sox || 1–2 || Rick Porcello (15–5) || Tommy Hunter (3–2) || Craig Kimbrel (36) || 33,081 || 65–53
|- style="background:#bfb"
| 119 || August 15 || Red Sox || 7–4 || Tommy Hunter (4–2) || Joe Kelly (4–1) || Seranthony Domínguez (13) || 35,266 || 66–53
|- style="background:#fbb"
| 120 || August 16 (1) || Mets || 4–24 || Corey Oswalt (2–2) || Ranger Suárez (1–1) || — || see 2nd game || 66–54
|- style="background:#bfb"
| 121 || August 16 (2) || Mets || 9–6 || Zach Eflin (9–4) || Steven Matz (5–10) || Seranthony Domínguez (14) || 33,049 || 67–54
|- style="background:#bfb"
| 122 || August 17 || Mets || 4–2 || Aaron Nola (14–3) || Noah Syndergaard (8–3) || Pat Neshek (3) || 40,460 || 68–54
|- style="background:#fbb"
| 123 || August 18 || Mets || 1–3 || Jacob deGrom (8–7) || Jake Arrieta (9–8) || — || 35,158 || 68–55
|- style="background:#fbb"
| 124 || August 19 || Mets || 2–8 || Jason Vargas (3–8) || Nick Pivetta (7–10) || — || 2,429 || 68–56
|- style="background:#fbb"
| 125 || August 21 || @ Nationals || 4–10 || Jimmy Cordero (1–0) || Víctor Arano (1–2) || — || 24,080 || 68–57
|- style="background:#fbb"
| 126 || August 22 || @ Nationals || 7–8 || Matt Grace (1–1) || Seranthony Domínguez (1–4) || — || 31,855 || 68–58
|- style="background:#bfb"
| 127 || August 23 || @ Nationals || 2–0 || Aaron Nola (15–3) || Max Scherzer (16–6) || Pat Neshek (4) || 29,475 || 69–58
|- style="background:#fbb"
| 128 || August 24 || @ Blue Jays || 2–4 || Ryan Borucki (3–3) || Jake Arrieta (9–9) || Ken Giles (17) || 26,292 || 69–59
|- style="background:#fbb"
| 129 || August 25 || @ Blue Jays || 6–8 || Joe Biagini (2–7) || Seranthony Domínguez (1–5) || Ken Giles (18) || 33,127 || 69–60
|- style="background:#bfb"
| 130 || August 26 || @ Blue Jays || 8–3 || Vince Velasquez (9–9) || Marco Estrada (7–10) || — || 28,209 || 70–60
|- style="background:#fbb"
| 131 || August 27 || Nationals || 3–5 || Stephen Strasburg (7–7) || Zach Eflin (9–5) || Justin Miller (1) || 21,261 || 70–61
|- style="background:#fbb"
| 132 || August 28 || Nationals || 4–5 || Koda Glover (1–2) || Pat Neshek (1–1) || Greg Holland (1) || 21,083 || 70–62
|- style="background:#bfb"
| 133 || August 29 || Nationals || 8–6 || Seranthony Domínguez (2–5) || Jimmy Cordero (1–1) || Tommy Hunter (3) || 22,525 || 71–62
|- style="background:#bfb"
| 134 || August 31 || Cubs || 2–1 (10) || Pat Neshek (2–1) || Steve Cishek (4–2) || — || 22,556 || 72–62
|-

|- style="background:#fbb"
| 135 || September 1 || Cubs || 1–7 || Kyle Hendricks (11–10) || Zach Eflin (9–6) || — || 33,040 || 72–63
|- style="background:#fbb"
| 136 || September 2 || Cubs || 1–8 || Jon Lester (15–5) || Aaron Nola (15–4) || — || 36,517 || 72–64
|- style="background:#fbb"
| 137 || September 3 || @ Marlins || 1–3 || José Ureña (5–12) || Vince Velasquez (9–10) || Drew Steckenrider (3) || 7,771 || 72–65
|- style="background:#bfb"
| 138 || September 4 || @ Marlins || 9–4 || Jake Arrieta (10–9) || Trevor Richards (3–8) || — || 7,131 || 73–65
|- style="background:#fbb"
| 139 || September 5 || @ Marlins || 1–2 || Sandy Alcántara (2–0) || Nick Pivetta (7–11) || Drew Steckenrider (4) || 6,427 || 73–66
|- style="background:#bfb"
| 140 || September 7 || @ Mets || 4–3 || Aaron Nola (16–4) || Tyler Bashlor (0–3) || Tommy Hunter (4) || 23,379 || 74–66
|- style="background:#fbb"
| 141 || September 8 || @ Mets || 5–10 || Noah Syndergaard (11–3) || Zach Eflin (9–7) || — || 25,094 || 74–67
|- style="background:#fbb"
| 142 || September 9 || @ Mets || 4–6 || Drew Gagnon (1–1) || Vince Velasquez (9–11) || Seth Lugo (2) || 24,153 || 74–68
|- style="background:#bbb"
| — || September 10 || Nationals || colspan=6 | Postponed (wet grounds) Makeup: September 11 as a single-admission doubleheader
|- style="background:#fbb"
| 143 || September 11 (1)|| Nationals || 1–3 || Erick Fedde (2–3) || Nick Pivetta (7–12) || Sean Doolittle (23) || see 2nd game || 74–69
|- style="background:#fbb"
| 144 || September 11 (2)|| Nationals || 6–7 (10) || Wander Suero (3–0) || Yacksel Ríos (3–2) || Greg Holland (3) || 19,630 || 74–70
|- style="background:#fbb"
| 145 || September 12 || Nationals || 1–5 || Stephen Strasburg (8–7) || Aaron Nola (16–5) || — || 20,258 || 74–71
|- style="background:#bfb"
| 146 || September 14 || Marlins || 14–2 || Zach Eflin (10–7) || Wei-Yin Chen (6–11) || — || 21,671 || 75–71
|- style="background:#bfb"
| 147 || September 15 || Marlins || 5–4 || Luis García (3–1) || Drew Rucinski (4–2) || Pat Neshek (5) || 24,695 || 76–71
|- style="background:#fbb"
| 148 || September 16 || Marlins || 4–6 || José Ureña (7–12) || Nick Pivetta (7–13) || — || 30,040 || 76–72
|- style="background:#fbb"
| 149 || September 17 || Mets || 4–9 || Zack Wheeler (12–7) || Tommy Hunter (4–3) || — || 21,767 || 76–73
|- style="background:#bfb"
| 150 || September 18 || Mets || 5–2 || Pat Neshek (3–1) || Drew Smith (1–1) || Héctor Neris (11) || 18,895 || 77–73
|- style="background:#bfb"
| 151 || September 19 || Mets || 4–0 || Zach Eflin (11–7) || Noah Syndergaard (12–4) || — || 19,085 || 78–73
|- style="background:#fbb"
| 152 || September 20 || @ Braves || 3–8 || Jesse Biddle (6–1) || Tommy Hunter (4–4) || — || 27,474 || 78–74
|- style="background:#fbb"
| 153 || September 21 || @ Braves || 5–6 || Jonny Venters (5–1) || Pat Neshek (3–2) || A. J. Minter (15) || 34,370 || 78–75
|- style="background:#fbb"
| 154 || September 22 || @ Braves || 3–5 || Mike Foltynewicz (12–10) || Jake Arrieta (10–10) || Arodys Vizcaíno (16) || 35,616 || 78–76
|- style="background:#fbb"
| 155 || September 23 || @ Braves || 1–2 || Aníbal Sánchez (17–6) || Aaron Nola (16–6) || Shane Carle (1) || 34,214 || 78–77
|- style="background:#fbb"
| 156 || September 24 || @ Rockies || 1–10 || Jon Gray (12–8) || Zach Eflin (11–8) || — || 30,366 || 78–78
|- style="background:#fbb"
| 157 || September 25 || @ Rockies || 3–10 || D. J. Johnson (1–0) || Vince Velasquez (9–12) || — || 30,217 || 78–79
|- style="background:#fbb"
| 158 || September 26 || @ Rockies || 0–14 || Germán Márquez (14–10) || Nick Pivetta (7–14) || — || 35,181 || 78–80
|- style="background:#fbb"
| 159 || September 27 || @ Rockies || 3–5 || Scott Oberg (8–1) || Jake Arrieta (10–11) || Wade Davis (42) || 36,448 || 78–81
|- style="background:#fbb"
| 160 || September 28 || Braves || 2–10 || Mike Foltynewicz (13–10) || Jerad Eickhoff (0–1) || — || 24,306 || 78–82
|- style="background:#bfb"
| 161 || September 29 || Braves || 3–0 || Aaron Nola (17–6) || Jonny Venters (5–2) || Seranthony Domínguez (15) || 30,886 || 79–82
|- style="background:#bfb"
| 162 || September 30 || Braves || 3–1 || Tommy Hunter (5–4) || Kevin Gausman (10–11) || Seranthony Domínguez (16) || 34,202 || 80–82
|-

Roster
All players who made an appearance for the Phillies during 2018 are included.

Farm system

See also
 2018 MLB Little League Classic
 1964 Philadelphia Phillies season

References

External links
 2018 Philadelphia Phillies season at Baseball Reference
 Philadelphia Phillies' official website

Philadelphia Phillies seasons
Philadelphia Phillies
Philadelphia Phillies